Bill Wallace may refer to:

Bill Wallace (American football) (1912–1993), American football player
Bill Wallace (martial artist) (born 1945), American karateka and kickboxer
Bill Wallace (author) (1947–2012), American author of children's books
Bill Wallace (writer) (1924–2012), an American sportswriter for The New York Times

See also 
William Wallace (disambiguation)